The 2020 League of Legends World Championship was an esports tournament for the multiplayer online battle arena video game League of Legends. It was the tenth iteration of the League of Legends World Championship, an annual international tournament organized by the game's developer, Riot Games. It was held from 25 September to 31 October in Shanghai, China. Twenty-two teams from eleven regions qualified for the tournament based on their placement in regional circuits, such as those in China, Europe, North America, South Korea and Taiwan/Hong Kong/Macau/Southeast Asia, with ten of those teams having to reach the main "groups" event via a play-in stage.

"Take Over" was the tournament's theme song, put together by Henry Lau, Max Schneider, and A Day to Remember's lead vocalist Jeremy McKinnon.

Impact of the COVID-19 pandemic and other issues
The COVID-19 pandemic, which was mainly confined to China in January and early February 2020, affected the multi-city hosting format that was present previously. On 1 August, Riot Games announced the dates and location of the event, with all stages taking place in Shanghai through the use of an "isolation bubble" environment.

In September 2020, Riot Games announced that due to travel restrictions, two teams from VCS of Vietnam would not participate in the tournament.

During the 2020 Worlds Group Draw Show, it was revealed that PSG Talon's members "River" and "Tank" would be unable to attend the play-in stage due to delayed visas and quarantine issues, and that Hsiao "Kongyue" Jen-tso and Chen "Uniboy" Chang-chu would be loaned from ahq eSports Club to replace them. The organization confirmed this in an official announcement the next day, and further stated that "Unified" would also be unable to participate in the first half of the play-in stage for the same reason. Chen "Dee" Chun-dee was loaned from Machi Esports to replace Unified.

Qualified teams and rosters

Qualified teams 
As the two Vietnamese teams (the Champion's Team Flash and Runner-up's GAM Esports of VCS Summer) are unable to participate, the third seed team from South Korea (LCK) will be promoted to start in the main group stage, as they were previously dropped to the play-in stage. The qualification format for North America and Europe changed with teams directly qualifying based on the results from their respective summer playoffs. Due to the merger of Taiwan/Hong Kong/Macau (LMS) and the Southeast Asian (LST) professional leagues into a single league (PCS) and have been reduced number of Worlds' spots from 4 to 2, Europe (LEC) will have another direct spot in the group stage and China (LPL) will have an additional spot in the play-in stage for the regional finals runner-up.

For the pool, the Main Group stage's pool #2 with 8 teams like as last year will be split to two pools #2 and pool #3, with 4 teams each pool. Qualified teams from Play-in stage will be drawn as pool #4. The Play-in stage's pool #3 in last year will be merged into pool #2, increased to 6 teams.

Rosters 
 Player didn't play any games.

Venues 
Shanghai was the city chosen to host the competition. Almost all matches were played at Shanghai Media Tech Studio without spectators due to the COVID-19 pandemic, while the final match was held at Pudong Football Stadium.

Play-in stage 
 Venue: Shanghai Media Tech Studio.

Play-in groups 
 Date and time: 25–28 September, began at 16:00 CST (UTC +08:00).
 Ten teams are drawn into two groups, with five teams in each group.
 Single round robin, all matches are best-of-one.
 If teams have same win–loss record at the end of play-ins, they play a tie-breaker match. A two-way tie is not broken by the results of the head-to-head game those teams played, however the team that won in the head-to-head gets side selection in the tiebreaker game.
 The top team automatically qualifies for the main event's group stage, while 2nd to 4th-place of each group advance to the play-in knockouts and 2nd-place receives a bye to Round 2. The bottom team is eliminated.

Group A

Group B

Play-in knockouts 
 Date and time: 29–30 September
 King of the hill format with two branch. Single-elimination. All matches are best-of-five.
 The 3rd-place and 4th-place teams from the same group play each other in Round 1. Winner will play against with the 2nd-place team from other group in Round 2.
 The upper-place team chooses the side for all odd-numbered games, while the lower-place team chooses the side of even-numbered games.
 The winners of the Round 2 in each branch advances to the main event's group stage.

Branch A2-B3-B4

Round 1 

 Date and time: 29 September, 14:00 CST (UTC +08:00).

Round 2 

 Date: 30 September, 14:00 CST (UTC +08:00).

Branch B2-A3-A4

Round 1 
 Date and time: 29 September, 17:00 CST (UTC +08:00).

Round 2 

 Date: 30 September, 17:00 CST (UTC +08:00).

Group stage 
 Venue: Shanghai Media Tech Studio.
 Date and time: 3–11 October, began at 16:00 CST (UTC +08:00).
 Sixteen teams are drawn into four groups with four teams in each group based on their seeding. Teams of the same region cannot be placed in the same group.
 Double round robin, all matches are best-of-one.
 If teams have the same win–loss record and head-to-head record, a tiebreaker match is played for first or second place.
 Top two teams will advance to Playoff Stage. Bottom two teams are eliminated.

Group A

Group B

Group C

Group D

Playoff stage 
 Date and time: 15–31 October, all matches will begin at 18:00 CST (UTC +08:00).
 Eight teams are drawn into a single elimination bracket.
 All matches are best-of-five.
 The 1st-place team of each group is drawn against the 2nd-place team of a different group.
 Teams from same group will be on opposite sides of the bracket, meaning they cannot play each other until the Finals.

Quarterfinals 
 Venue: Shanghai Media Tech Studio
 The 1st-place team chooses the side for all odd-numbered games, while the 2nd-place team chooses the side of even-numbered games.
 The winner(s) will advance to the semifinals.

Match 1 
 Date and time: 15 October, 18:00 CST (UTC +08:00).

Match 2 
 Date: 16 October, 18:00 CST (UTC +08:00)

Match 3 
 Date: 17 October, 18:00 CST (UTC +08:00)

Match 4 
 Date: 18 October, 18:00 CST (UTC +08:00)

Semifinals 
 Venue: Shanghai Media Tech Studio.
 The winner(s) will advance to the Finals.

Match 1 
 Date: 24 October, 18:00 CST (UTC +08:00).

Match 2 
 Date: 25 October, 18:00 CST (UTC +08:00).

Finals 

 Venue: Pudong Football Stadium
 Date and time: 31 October, 18:00 CST (UTC +08:00).
 The members of the winning team will lift the Summoner's Cup, earning their title as the League of Legends 2020 World Champions.

Ranking

Team ranking 

 (*) Not include tie-break games.
 The Vietnamese teams from VCS Summer who are unable to attend will be earned a 2.1% of prize pool, with 1.5% of Main Group Stage seed for the Champion (Team Flash) and 0.6% of Play-in Groups seed for the Runner-up (GAM Esports).

Regional ranking

 The win-ratio is determined by number of won games compared the number of games played.
 Bracket stage wins are prioritized.
 (*) Does not include tiebreaker games.

References 

League of Legends World Championship
2020 multiplayer online battle arena tournaments
League
The Game Awards winners